Koyashskoye or Koyashs'ke is a salt lake on the coast of the Kerch Peninsula in Crimea, separated from the Black Sea by a strip of land. It is 4 kilometers long, 2 kilometers wide and a meter deep. The lake has the particularity to have a pink to scarlet color, depending on the light, due to the presence of microscopic algae living in the water. When the water evaporates, the salt in the lake crystallizes on the stones and the shores, producing crystal stones and the scent of viola. Uzunlarske Lake is located directly west. 

This location is considered healing and is appreciated by some locals. It is not widely known to tourists.

References 
 
 

Saline lakes of Europe
Lakes of Crimea
Black Sea